Luliqucha (local Quechua luli interior (ruri), qucha lake, "interior lake", hispanicized spelling Lulicocha) is a mountain in the Andes of Peru, about  high, at a small lake of that name. It is located in the Lima Region, Oyón Province, Oyón District, and in the Pasco Region, Pasco Province,  Simón Bolívar District. The ridge of Luliqucha stretches along the border between the Lima Region and the Pasco Region, west of Pumaqucha.

References

Mountains of Peru
Mountains of Lima Region
Mountains of Pasco Region
Lakes of Peru
Lakes of Pasco Region